Nargho  is a village development committee in Saptari District in the Sagarmatha Zone of southeastern Nepal. At the time of the 1991 Nepal census it had a population of 4640 people living in 960 households. Different caste people like jha, yadav, mandal, sha, ram, karn, paswan, sharma, dom, shada etc., used to live in village. It consists of four subvillages (Puwaritol, Pachhwaritol, Anderi, and Katti). It has three small bazaars but it does not have good road facility. Most of the people are farmers and they grow paddy, wheat, pulses, vegetables, etc. Some of the people used to depend on animal husbandry and fishery to survive.

Education
There are four governmental school in VDC.
Shree janta higher secondary school.
Shree janta primary school (in Puwaritol).
Shree rastriya prathmic vidhalay

Economy
There are three small chowk (place where goods are sold) within the village. These chowk are:
Jhauhura chowk Main
Purnaa chowk
Puchhbari chowk 
These chowk are small bazaars and people can sell goods (especially vegetables, fruit, pulses, Fish, meat, earthenware, clothes etc.) two days of per week every chowk.

Ancient history
Actually at ancient time Nargho is called Rajgardh Nargho. It means 'place of King' (royal place) because of the Baise Rajya king who ruled at that time. There are numbers of historical ancient ponds like Ratna Sagar, Jhauhura Sagar, Gonahi Pond etc. which were worshiped by the indigenous people of Nargho from ancient times to the present day because of their myths. Every new year 1st and 2nd of Baisakh (April - May ) indigenous people bring water from Jhauhura Sagar for drinking and cooking purposes but only some drops of water are used for purification of body and soul.

References

Populated places in Saptari District
VDCs in Saptari District